Barry Mills may refer to:

 Barry Mills (college president) (born 1950), fourteenth president of Bowdoin College
 Barry Mills (Aryan Brotherhood) (1948–2018), leader of the Aryan Brotherhood prison gang
 Barry Mills (producer), American film producer, director, and writer

See also
 Barry Mill, a watermill in Barry, Angus, Scotland